A lake pigment is a pigment made by precipitating a dye with an inert binder, or mordant, usually a metallic salt. Unlike vermilion, ultramarine, and other pigments made from ground minerals, lake pigments are organic.  Manufacturers and suppliers to artists and industry frequently omit the lake designation in the name. Many lake pigments are fugitive because the dyes involved are not lightfast. Red lakes were particularly important in Renaissance and Baroque paintings;  they were often used as translucent glazes to portray the colors of rich fabrics and draperies.

Etymology
The term "lake" is derived from the term lac, the secretions of the Indian wood insect Kerria lacca (formerly Laccifer lacca or Coccus lacca). It has the same root as the word lacquer, and comes originally from the Hindi word lakh, through the Arabic word lakk and the Persian word lak.

Chemistry

Many lake pigments are azo dyes. They characteristically have sulfonate and sometimes carboxylate substituents, which confer negative charge to the chromophore (colored species).

The metallic salts or binders used are typically colourless or almost so. The organic component of the dye determines the color of the resulting precipitate. In ancient times chalk, white clay, and crushed bones were used as sources of the calcium salts. Today metallic salts are typically chromium or cobalt, and the resulting lake pigment is diluted with an inert material such as alumina.

History and art

Lake pigments have a long history in decoration and the arts. Some have been produced for thousands of years and traded over long distances.

The red lakes were particularly important in the history of art; because they were translucent, they were often used in layers of glazes over a more opaque red (sometimes the mineral-based pigment vermilion, or sometimes a red lake mixed with lead white or vermilion) to create a deep, rich red color. They are common in paintings by Venetian artists of the 16th century, including Titian, to depict fine draperies and fabrics.

 Indigo lake was originally produced from the leaves of woad, and was known in ancient Egypt. In the late Middle Ages, a fashion for woad as a textile dye led to overplanting and soil exhaustion in many parts of Europe. After trade routes opened to the east, indigo was imported from India as a substitute for woad, and the cultivation of woad became uneconomical in Europe. Today, the dark blue dye known as indigo once produced from woad and Indigofera tinctoria is largely of synthetic origin.
 Rose madder lake, originally from the root of the madder plant, is also known as alizarin crimson in its synthetic form. Since rose madder is fugitive when exposed to light, its use has been largely superseded, even in synthetic form, by quinacridone pigments. 
 Carmine lake, also called crimson lake, was originally produced from the cochineal insect, native to Central and South America. When the Spanish conquered the Aztec Empire (1518–1521), they encountered Aztec warriors garbed in an unknown crimson color. Cochineal became their second most valuable export from the New World, after silver, and the Spanish zealously guarded the secret of its production for centuries. Carminic acid, the organic compound which gives carmine its color, was synthesized in 1991. Researchers are now examining the potential to genetically engineer microbes to produce carminic acid.

Indigo and rose madder are now produced more cheaply from synthetic sources, although some use of natural products persists, especially among artisans. The food and cosmetics industries have shown renewed interest in cochineal as a source of natural red dye.

References

Pigments